Desojo is a town and municipality located in the province and autonomous community of Navarre, northern Spain. (Esotzo in euskera)

References

External links
 DESOJO in the Bernardo Estornés Lasa - Auñamendi Encyclopedia (Euskomedia Fundazioa) 

Municipalities in Navarre